Made of Money may refer to:

 "Made of Money", a song from Adam Ant's 1982 album Friend or Foe
 "Made of Money", a song from The Promise (T'Pau album), 1991
 "Made of Money", a song from !!!'s 2010 album Strange Weather, Isn't It?

See also
 Making Money (disambiguation)